Samuel Allsopp & Sons was one of the largest breweries operating in Burton upon Trent, England.

History

Origins
Allsopp's origins go back to the 1740s, when Benjamin Wilson, an innkeeper-brewer of Burton, brewed beer for his own premises and sold some to other innkeepers. Over the next 60 years, Wilson and his son and successor, also called Benjamin, cautiously built up the business and became the town's leading brewer. In about 1800, Benjamin Junior took his nephew Samuel Allsopp into the business and then in 1807, following a downturn in trade because of the Napoleonic blockade, he sold his brewery to Allsopp for £7,000.

Allsopp struggled at first as he tried to replace the lost Baltic trade with home trade, but in 1822 he successfully copied the India Pale Ale of Hodgson, a London brewer, and business started to improve.

Commercial success
After Samuel's death in 1838, his sons Charles and Henry continued the brewery as Allsopp and Sons. In 1859 they built a new brewery near the railway station, and added a prestigious office block in 1864. By 1861 Allsopps was the second largest brewery after Bass. Henry Allsopp retired in 1882 and his son Samuel Charles Allsopp took over.

Issue of shares, financial problems
Allsopps was incorporated as a public limited company in 1887 under the style Samuel Allsopp & Sons Limited . There were scuffles at the doors of the bank in the City as potential investors fought for copies of the prospectus, but within three years, these investors were demanding their money back as the returns were so much lower than predicted. Under Samuel Allsopp, who became the 2nd Lord Hindlip on the death of his father, Allsopps lurched from crisis to crisis. A lack of tied houses, in addition to the ambitious introduction of a lager plant in 1897, which did not meet sales expectations, proved to be a major financial burden. With the difficult trading conditions for beer at the beginning of the 20th century, many Burton breweries were forced to close down or amalgamate. After a failed attempt at a merger with Thomas Salt and Co and the Burton Brewery Company in 1907, Allsopps fell into the hands of the receivers in 1911. The receiver, Sir William Barclay Peat, brought in John J. Calder, a 45 year old experienced brewery manager from Alloa in Scotland to revive the business.

Merger, Allsopp name dropped
The company's capital was restructured, Calder proceeded to acquire smaller breweries in order to expand Allsopp's tied house estate, and the business continued trading. In 1921 Calder transferred the idle lager plant to Alloa where it later produced the forerunner brands of Skol lager. In 1935 Samuel Allsopp & Sons merged with Ind Coope Ltd to form Ind Coope and Allsopp Ltd. The Allsopp name was dropped in 1959 and in 1971 Ind Coope was incorporated into Allied Breweries.

Attempts at revival
In August 2017, the Scottish craft brewery Brewdog put in an application to acquire an Allsopp trademark. In their 2018 Manifesto  James Watt stated that they were working with beer historian Martyn Cornell in order to recreate the original century recipe. This may have influenced AbInBev bringing back Bass Pale in the UK as the original IPA.

Jamie Allsopp, a direct descendant of Samuel Allsopp has consolidated the scattered trademarks and found possibly the only remaining ledger containing the authentic recipes. The revived company commenced test brewing in 2020, staying as close as possible to the original recipes.

See also

 Brewers of Burton

References

Defunct breweries of the United Kingdom
Food and drink companies established in 1807
Companies based in Burton upon Trent
1807 establishments in England
British companies established in 1807